Sebuku (old spelling Seboekoe) is a  island south-east of Borneo and administratively part of South Kalimantan, Indonesia. Sebuku is home to a large coal mine operated by Straits Asia Resources, which produces 3 million tonnes of coal every year.

Overview
Administratively, it is part of South Kalimantan, Indonesia. It is on the Kanibungan Fault. 

Coal was first found on the island by the Dutch colonial government in 1925. Large deposits of coal, dating from the Eocene, have been found in Sebuku's south-west region; the main deposit forms a syncline which trends from north to south. The strata around the coal is mainly mudstone and shale.

Prior to the opening of the coal mine, it had no infrastructure; now there are small roads, a port, and a small airfield.

Mining
Although the Dutch originally discovered at least 25 coal deposits on Sebuku, after realizing that the island may not survive mining they cancelled their plans. Instead, they kept the island as a preserved park to serve as a buffer for Laut Island.

Due to estimates of coal reserves measuring eleven million metric tonnes, infrastructure for a mine was built beginning in June 1997; mining began in December of the same year, despite concerns that the mining could sink the island. The mine is operated by Singapore-based Straits Asia Resources, a subsidiary of Straits Resources. Mining is done using multiple open pits.

As of 30 June 2008, the total remaining coal was estimated at 384 megatonnes, with a reserve base of 19 megatonnes. Production is estimated to be 3 megatonnes per annum.

References

Coal mines in Indonesia
Islands of Kalimantan
Landforms of South Kalimantan
Populated places in Indonesia